Die große Chance ("The Big Chance") is an Austrian talent television show, originally aired between 1980 and 1990, then revived in 2011.

Background
Die große Chance was originally broadcast by the Österreichischen Rundfunk (Austrian Broadcasting Corporation) showing on prime time between 1980 and 1990. Peter Rapp hosted the show from 1980 to 1988. Thomas Klock took over in 1988 and Elisabeth Engstler in 1989 and 1990. The programme was discontinued in 1991.

2011-present: Revival
Die große Chance was revived as a competitive talent show starting 2011. It was broadcast on Austrian television ORF eins. 

The first season broadcast between 9 September and 11 November 2011 was won by singer Christine Hödl in 2011, with Valerian Kapeller as runner-up and Magic Acrobatics third. It was hosted by Andi Knoll. Notably, the 2014 Eurovision Song Contest eventual winner, Conchita Wurst, came sixth in the 2011 series.

The second season broadcast from 7 September to 2 November 2012 and was won by dancing duo Alexandra und Esprit, with the music band Solid Tube as runner-up and cabaret act Flo und Wisch third. Andi Knoll hosted the programme for a second season.

The third season in 2013 was hosted by Alice Tumler and was won by vocals and harp act Harfonie, with singer/ steirische harmonika player Petra Mayer as runner-up and singer Ivana Cibulova third.

Die große Comedy Chance
Another offshoot of the programme was Die große Comedy Chance for giving a chance for comedians to perform. The first series was broadcast in 2012, also hosted by Andi Knoll and won by Zwa Voitrottln with a second season in 2014 won by Olivier Sanrey.

1980 Austrian television series debuts
1990 Austrian television series endings
2011 Austrian television series debuts
1980s Austrian television series
1990s Austrian television series
2010s Austrian television series
ORF (broadcaster) original programming
German-language television shows